The Perils of Pauline is a 1947 American Technicolor film directed by George Marshall and released by Paramount Pictures. The film is a fictionalized Hollywood account of silent film star Pearl White's rise to fame, starring Betty Hutton as White.

A broad satire of silent-film production, the film is a musical-comedy vehicle for Hutton. The original songs by Frank Loesser include the standard "I Wish I Didn't Love You So", which received an Academy Award nomination for Best Original Song. Paul Panzer, who played the villain in the 1914 film The Perils of Pauline, has a very small part in this film, as do silent-comedy veterans Chester Conklin, Hank Mann, Snub Pollard, and James Finlayson.

The film is in the public domain today; all public-domain video releases are sourced from 16 mm television prints that have faded over the years. Universal Studios (through NBC Universal Television, successor-in-interest to EMKA, Ltd.) owns the original film elements.

Plot
Pearl White (Betty Hutton) is a frustrated garment worker who aspires to become a dramatic actress, although she really shines at singing and bantering with audiences. (Shoved on stage to do or die, she throws the tomatoes back at the hecklers.) She joins a touring theatrical troupe owned and managed by handsome but pompous Mike Farrington (John Lund). Veteran actress Miss Julia Gibbs (Constance Collier) takes Pearl under her wing, as does Timmy Timmons (Billy De Wolfe), another member of the troupe. Farrington starts her off by putting her in charge of costumes and giving her walk-ons. Unable to suppress her natural rambunctiousness on stage, Pearl resorts to tying her hands together under an apron. Mike and Pearl fall in love, but neither confesses it. In a South Sea melodrama, Pearl is drenched with cold water, and shivers and sneezes so badly that she can't speak. Farrington berates and insults her; Pearl reads him the riot act and walks out. Julia follows her.

Pearl auditions for Julia's agents, singing “I Wish I Didn't Love You So.” They like her, but there is no business in summer. The agent offers Julia a “grande dame” role in a “flicker.” Julia scorns film actors, but her agent points out, “They always eat!”

At the studio, several pictures are being filmed at once. With no advance warning, Julia is barraged with pies. Furious, Pearl storms onto the set and retaliates, then helps her friend walk through several works in progress, shooing a lion out of the way. (She thought it was a dog.) The director, George “Mac” McGuire (William Demarest), offers her a  $100 a week contract. “She's gonna be the biggest thing in pictures!” he declares. Pearl soon becomes world-famous as the star of the cliffhanging, tied-to-the-railroad-tracks serials known as The Perils of Pauline. Meanwhile, Farrington can't get work; the theaters are showing pictures.

Pearl is filming a pursuit alongside a train. She jumps onto a boxcar and meets a hobo: It's Timmy, who promptly joins Pearl's team as a villain. Later, Timmy finds Mike working as a barker in a sideshow. He tells Mike his new boss has a job for him. It is, of course, Pearl, who persuades him to become her leading man. His first lesson is that the kind of melodramatic gestures that he abhorred in Pearl are exactly what is needed in silent film. They are a success.

McGuire arranges a publicity stunt that sends Pearl and Mike off in a runaway balloon—without the balloonist who was supposed to sneak into the basket. The balloon is caught in a thunderstorm and they cling to each other. He tells her he loves her and promises to marry her.

The press announcement sidelines Mike, who feels he has lost his identity. His pride can't take it and he calls off the wedding. Then War is declared. Mike and Timmy join the Army; Pearl does benefits and makes war films. After the war ends, Mike comes home to find great success in the theater. Serials are on their way out, and Pearl and Timmy go to Paris to perform in a nightclub there. Farrington can't follow her until his play is over.

After 251 performance at the Casino de Paris, Pearl learns that Mike is coming. Elated, she falls during a stunt. The doctors tell her that she must have surgery immediately; even so, it might be one or two years before she can walk again. Instead, she goes to meet Mike. He begs her to marry him and come back to America. When she says she won't leave Paris, he replies that he will come to her. She tells him she doesn't love him anymore. Julia has followed them, and when Mike gets out of the car she beckons to him. A sorrowful Pearl gets Timmy to take her into a theater showing one of their films. Eyes on the screen, she hears Mike's voice saying, “You always were a rotten actress.” They embrace, and he carries her out of the theater.

Cast
 Betty Hutton as Pearl White
 John Lund as Michael Farrington
 Billy De Wolfe as Mr. Timmy Timmons
 William Demarest as George "Mac" McGuire
 Constance Collier as Julia Gibbs
 Frank Faylen as Mr. Joe Gurt
 William Farnum as Western Saloon Set Hero
 Chester Conklin as Comic Chef
 Paul Panzer as Drawing Room Gent (Panzer was the villain in the original serial)
 "Snub" Pollard as Western Saloon Set Propman
 James Finlayson as Comic Chef
 Creighton Hale as Marcelled Leading Man (Hale was the male lead in the original serial)
 Hank Mann as Comic Chef
 Francis McDonald as Western Saloon Set Heavy
 Bert Roach as Western Saloon Set Bartender
 Heinie Conklin as Studio Cop
 Ray Walker as Armistice Day Set Technician
 Ethan Laidlaw as Stagehand (uncredited)
 Lester Dorr as Reporter (uncredited)

Soundtrack

 "Poor Pauline" (Written by Charles McCarron and Raymond Walker)
 Betty Hutton - "I Wish I Didn't Love You So" (Written by Frank Loesser)
 Betty Hutton - "The Sewing Machine" (Written by Frank Loesser)
 Betty Hutton - "Rumble, Rumble, Rumble" (Written by Frank Loesser)
 Betty Hutton - "Poppa, Don't Preach To Me" (Written by Frank Loesser)

Reception 
Bosley Crowther of New York Times wrote, "Paramount's The Perils of Pauline, which came sprawling and spluttering and crashing into the Paramount Theatre yesterday, is neither a reasonable facsimile of the silent ancient silent serial for which it is named, nor is it a rightful biography of the famous serial queen, Pearl White. Neither, for that matter, is it a valid reflection of the days of early movie-making which it loosely pretends to be".

A Variety review praised the comedy, cast, and silent film era nostalgia, calling the film "top entertainment for any situation" that "will register astoundingly at the [box office]".

Awards
Frank Loesser was nominated for an Oscar in the category "Best Music, Original Song" for "I Wish I Didn't Love You So".

See also
 The Perils of Pauline (1914), starring Pearl White
 The Perils of Pauline (1933), starring Evalyn Knapp and Craig Reynolds
 The Perils of Pauline (1967), starring Pamela Austin and Pat Boone

References

External links

 
 
 
 
 

1947 films
1947 comedy films
1940s historical comedy films
American historical comedy films
Articles containing video clips
Biographical films about actors
Films directed by George Marshall
Films scored by Robert Emmett Dolan
Films set in the 1910s
Films about filmmaking
Films produced by Sol C. Siegel
Paramount Pictures films
1940s English-language films
1940s American films